The 53rd World Rowing Junior Championships took place from 7 to 11 August 2019 at the Sea Forest Waterway, Odaiba (Tokyo Bay) in Tokyo, Japan.

Regatta venue
The regatta was held at Sea Forest Waterway, the venue constructed for the 2020 Summer Olympic Games and Paralympic Games in Tokyo. The water is about 6 metres deep. The course is 2335 meters long and 198 meters wide. Each lane is 12.5 12.5 m wide. There are 8 lanes.

Results

Men

Women

Medal table

References

External links
Official website 
WorldRowing website
Provisional programme 

2019
International sports competitions hosted by Japan
Rowing competitions in Japan
Junior
World Rowing Junior Championships
Rowing
World Rowing Junior Championships